William Henry Bonsey (July 1818 – September 1900) was an English first-class cricketer active in 1839 who played for Marylebone Cricket Club (MCC). He was born in Upton-cum-Chalvey and died in Eastbourne. He appeared in two first-class matches.

Notes

1818 births
1900 deaths
English cricketers
Marylebone Cricket Club cricketers